Orlets-1 or Don (GRAU index 17F12) is a Russian (previously Soviet) reconnaissance satellite.

Orlets-1 was made after it was concluded that the Yantar-2K satellite was not capable of providing strategic warning of attack, and drew on features of an existing draft project designated Yantar-6K. It has a wide-spectrum panoramic camera, carries 8 film return capsules and has a design life of 60 days, After its mission has ended, the satellite is detonated in its orbit.

Orlets-1 is being launched by the Soyuz-U or Soyuz-U2 launch vehicle.

An improved version of Orlets-1 exists, called Orlets-2.

References

 This article incorporates text from NSSDC Master Catalog, a publication in the public domain.

Reconnaissance satellites of the Soviet Union
Reconnaissance satellites of Russia